Valentine Sendanyoye Rugwabiza (born 25 July 1963) is a Rwandan businesswoman and politician who has served as the country's Permanent Representative to the United Nations from 2016 to 2018. She now is the Special Representative of the Secretary-General and head of MINUSCA, the United Nations peacekeeping mission in the Central African Republic.

Early life and education
Rugwabiza was born on 25 July 1963. She has a bachelor's and a master's degree in economics from the National University of Zaire.

Career
For eight years, Rugwabiza worked for Swiss multinational company Hoffmann-La Roche, first as the head of commercial development and marketing for Central Africa in Yaoundé, and then as regional director in Ivory Coast. She returned to Kigali in 1997 to run her own company, Synergy Group.

In 2002, Rugwabiza was appointed Rwanda's ambassador to Switzerland and Permanent Representative to the UN Office in Geneva, serving for three years.

From 2005 until 2013, Rugwabiza was Deputy Director-General of the World Trade Organization, the first woman to hold the position. She is a founding member of the Rwanda Private Sector Federation, the Rwanda Women Entrepreneurs’ Organization and the Rwandese Women Leaders’ Caucus.

Rugwabiza was CEO of the Rwanda Development Board from 2013 to 2014. She served as Minister for East African Community from 2014 to 2016. In 2015, she was named as one of Jeune Afrique's "50 powerful women in Africa."

Rugwabiza was appointed Rwanda's Permanent Representative to the United Nations by President Paul Kagame in November 2016. She remains a member of the Cabinet of Rwanda and was a member of the East African Legislative Assembly for a five-year term from 2012 until June 2017.

In February 2022, the UN announced that Valentine Rugwabiza would replace the Senegalese Mankeur Ndiaye at the head of Minusca, the United Nations peacekeeping mission in the Central African Republic.

Personal life
Rugwabiza is married to John Paulin Sendanyoye.

See also
 Cabinet of Rwanda

Publications

References

1963 births
Living people
Government ministers of Rwanda
Permanent Representatives of Rwanda to the United Nations
World Trade Organization people
East African Community officials
Members of the East African Legislative Assembly
Women government ministers of Rwanda
Rwandan businesspeople
Rwandan women diplomats
Rwandan women ambassadors
Special Representatives of the Secretary-General of the United Nations